Voice of Baceprot (pronounced 'bah-che-prot')—often abbreviated as VOB—are an Indonesian all-female rock trio formed in Garut, West Java, in 2014. The group consists of Firda Marsya Kurnia (vocals and guitar), Widi Rahmawati (bass), and Euis Siti Aisyah (drums). They sing in English as well as Sundanese. The word baceprot means "noisy" in Sundanese. It is meant to represent the band's musical style.

History

Formation
VOB formed in the West Javan city of Garut in 2014. They generated numerous views on YouTube with a cover of a Rage Against the Machine song in 2015. The trio continued to produce videos of cover songs by artists such as Red Hot Chili Peppers, Metallica, and Slipknot.
The band presented a seemingly contradictory image, with their heavy style of playing, in contrast to their modest Islamic attire, including the hijab, worn by all three members. This has caused them to receive criticism from some conservative Muslims in their hometown of Garut. They have also received support, however, from various quarters.
All three girls had been learning to play musical instruments at school and were encouraged by their theatre coach to sign up for band competitions. Their coach went on to become their manager as well as lyricist.

First single and recognition

In 2018, VOB signed a deal with Jakarta-based booking agency Amity Asia. Not long after, they released their long-awaited debut single, "School Revolution". The single gained the band significant traction and they received a number of invitations to perform at international music festivals.

When American rock band Guns N' Roses played at the Gelora Bung Karno Stadium in Jakarta in November 2018, guitarist Slash invited the trio to meet him backstage.
They received further endorsements on social media from Rage Against the Machine guitarist Tom Morello and Red Hot Chili Peppers bassist Flea, as well as Living Colour guitarist Vernon Reid.

Second single and live EP

In early 2021, VOB returned to the studio to work on "God, Allow Me (Please) to Play Music", their first original single in three years. The song was released on 17 August 2021, preceded by an EP of five live tracks, titled The Other Side of Metalism (Live Session).

Band members
 Firda Marsya Kurnia – vocals, guitar
 Euis Siti Aisyah – drums
 Widi Rahmawati – bass

Discography
EPs
 The Other Side of Metalism (Live Session) (2021)

Singles
 "School Revolution" (2018)
 "God, Allow Me (Please) to Play Music" (2021)
 "[NOT] Public Property" (2022)
 "PMS – Perempuan Merdeka Seutuhnya" (2022)

References

External links
 
 Voice of Baceprot music on ReverbNation

All-female bands
Indonesian heavy metal musical groups
Indonesian musical trios
Thrash metal musical groups
2014 establishments in Indonesia
Musical groups established in 2014
Musical groups from West Java